Shalimovo is a rural locality (a village) in Yugskoye Rural Settlement, Cherepovetsky District, Vologda Oblast, Russia. The population was 165 as of 2002. There are 6 streets.

Geography 
Shalimovo is located 56 km southeast of Cherepovets (the district's administrative centre) by road. Baynovo is the nearest rural locality.

References 

Rural localities in Cherepovetsky District